Galea may refer to:

Galea (surname)
Galea (botany), a helmet-shaped structure in certain flowers
Galea (genus), a genus of rodents
Galea (helmet), ancient Roman helmet
Galea (insects), part of the maxilla in the mouthparts of insects
Galea shark, a superorder of sharks

See also
Galea aponeurotica, a fibrous tissue covering the cranium